Dino Dondi (10 July 1925 – 3 March 2007) was an Italian operatic baritone.

Life 
Like many Bolognese, Dondi had a passion for opera and after studying singing as an autodidact, he met a master who recognised his vocal talent.

At the beginning of the 1950s, after singing in theatres in Emilia, including Bologna, Dondi moved to Milan and in 1954 made his debut at the Teatro Nuovo in Verdis' Rigoletto.

Shortly afterwards, he was called by La Scala, where he sang, among other operas, in Iphigénie en Tauride by Christoph Willibald Gluck under the direction of Luchino Visconti, with Maria Callas and the direction of Nino Sanzogno (1957), and in Verdi's Macbeth, conducted by Thomas Schippers (1958).

He married  Irène Companeez, contralto.

Dondi died in the French department of Basse-Terre at the age of 81.

Recordings 

 1955: Don Sebastiano (Gaetano Donizetti), Carlo Maria Giulini conducting, role: Abaialdo
 1957: Iphigénie en Tauride (Christoph Willibald Gluck), Nino Sanzogno conducting, role: Oreste
 1958: Assassinio nella cattedrale (Ildebrando Pizzetti), Gianandrea Gavazzeni conducting, role: Terzo Sacerdote 
 1959:    Lucia di Lammermoor by Donizetti, RAI TV Milano, Fernando Previtali conducting, role: Lord Enrico Ashton
 1960: La Wally (Alfredo Catalani), Arturo Basile conducting, role: Vincenzo Gellner dell'Hochstoff
 1960: Nabucco (Giuseppe Verdi),  conducting, role: Nabucodonosor
 1961: Beatrice di Tenda by Vincenzo Bellini, Antonino Votto conducting, role: Filippo Maria Visconti
 1966: I puritani  by Vincenzo Bellini, Arturo Basile conducting, role: Sir Riccardo Forth
 1969: Andrea Chénier (Umberto Giordano), Anton Guadagno conducting, role: Carlo Gérard

References

External links 
 

Italian baritones
1925 births
2007 deaths
Musicians from Bologna
20th-century Italian male opera singers